Zimring is a surname. Notable people with this surname include:
Carl A. Zimring, American environmental historian
Franklin Zimring, American law professor 
Maurice Zimm (real name Maury Zimring), American film writer and Franklin Zimring's father
Mike Zimring, American entertainment agent
Valerie Zimring, American Olympic gymnast